Haber is a surname of German origin. The meaning in old German is "oat". The cereal is now in German called . Notable people with this surname include:
 Alan Haber, American student activist
 Alessandro Haber, Italian actor, director, and singer
 Alicia Haber (born 1946), Uruguayan historian, art critic, curator, and teacher
 Bernard Haber (1920–1959), New York assemblyman
 Brett Haber, American sportscaster
 Daniel A. Haber, French oncologist, scientist and academic
 Daniel Haber (soccer) (born 1992), Canadian soccer player
 Eitan Haber (born 1940), Israeli journalist
 Fritz Haber (1868–1934), German chemist and Nobel Prize winner
 Heinz Haber (1913–1990), German physicist and science writer
 Howard E. Haber (born 1952), American physicist
 Justin Haber (born 1981), Maltese footballer
 Marco Haber (born 1971), German footballer
 Marcus Haber (born 1989), Canadian soccer player
 Peter Haber (born 1952), Swedish actor
 Ralf Haber (born 1962), German hammer thrower
 Shamai Haber (1922–1995), sculptor
 Yaacov Haber, American rabbi
 Yvonne Haber, Australian architect

See also
 23804 Haber, minor planet
 Born–Haber cycle, an approach to analyzing reaction energies
 Ḥaber, variant of chaber, Biblical term meaning "associate"; "colleague"; "fellow"; "companion"; "friend"
 Haber (film), a 2008 short-film depicting the work of Fritz Haber with the German army
 Haber process, the method of synthesizing ammonia from hydrogen and nitrogen
 Haber (annelid), a genus of annelids in the family Naididae

German-language surnames
Jewish surnames